Peter Döring (born 14 August 1943) is a German wrestler. He competed in the men's freestyle 87 kg at the 1968 Summer Olympics.

References

External links
 

1943 births
Living people
German male sport wrestlers
Olympic wrestlers of East Germany
Wrestlers at the 1968 Summer Olympics
Sportspeople from Rostock